Buyck is an unincorporated community in Portage Township, Saint Louis County, Minnesota, United States.

The community is located 16 miles east of Orr at the junction of Saint Louis County Road 23 (Orr–Buyck Road) and County Road 24 (Crane Lake Road).  Buyck is also located 34 miles northeast of Cook.

Buyck is located on the edge of the Kabetogama State Forest.  The Vermilion River flows through the community.

The first settlement is believed to be accompanying the gold-rush led settlement. Whilst first trades in town were parsemonious, the later development of the town brought school and church services. 

A post office called Buyck was established in 1913, and remained in operation until 1963. The community was named for Charles Buyck, an early settler and afterward county official.

References

 Rand McNally Road Atlas – 2007 edition – Minnesota entry
 Official State of Minnesota Highway Map – 2011/2012 edition

Unincorporated communities in Minnesota
Unincorporated communities in St. Louis County, Minnesota